Tanzania competed at the 1984 Summer Olympics in Los Angeles.

Athletics

Men
Track & road events

Field events

Women
Track & road events

Boxing

Men

See also
Tanzania at the 1982 Commonwealth Games
Tanzania at the 1986 Commonwealth Games

References

sports-reference
Official Olympic Reports

Nations at the 1984 Summer Olympics
1984
Olympics